Cortinarius elatior is a species of mushroom native to Europe which is commonly known as the wrinkled webcap due to the cap's tendency to wrinkle with age.

Description 
Cortinarius elatior is a large webcap mushroom with white flesh.

Cap: 5-11cm. Starts conical before flattening with an umbo. The cap may become sticky and slimy when wet and lined when older usually with white veil remnants on the edges. Stem: 5-8cm. Tapers down to the base such that it has a pointed appearance which is wider at the top. Partial veil is pale violet to blue in colour forming and indistinct ring zone. Gills: Cream turning reddish-brown with age. Spacing is distant and attachment to the stipe is adnate. Spore print: Reddish-brown. Spores: Almond to lemon shaped with warts. 11-15 x 7.5-9 μm. Taste: Indistinct. Smell: Sweet like honey but not pleasant.

See also
List of Cortinarius species

References

External links

elatior
Fungi described in 1801
Fungi of Europe
Taxa named by Elias Magnus Fries